Julian Gordon Worricker (born 6 January 1963 in Woking, Surrey) is an English journalist, currently working as one of the main presenters of Weekend on the BBC World Service, as stand in presenter of Any Answers on BBC Radio 4 and a relief presenter on The Media Show which is also seen on BBC News, the corporation's 24-hour rolling news channel. He also presented You and Yours on BBC Radio 4 until leaving in October 2013.

Worricker was educated at Epsom College; he went on to study English literature at the University of Leicester. He is an only child. He suffers from psoriatic arthritis.  Since 2020, he has been shielding in the COVID-19 pandemic.

He joined the BBC in 1985 as a staff reporter for BBC Radio Leicester before moving to Midlands Today as a TV presenter in 1988. In January 1989, he rejoined Radio Leicester as News Editor. In 1991, he moved to join the newly launched station Radio Five in Manchester, presenting the evening magazine programme, Five Aside. He joined Five Live at its launch in 1994, initially as a newsreader and reporter, but was soon a regular presenter on Weekend Breakfast before presenting Five Live Breakfast alongside Victoria Derbyshire. He then moved to the mid-morning show from July 2003 (taking over from Fi Glover) until July 2004, when he left to become a relief presenter for BBC News. On occasion, he has presented the BBC Radio 4 obituary programme Last Word.

From September 2002 until September 2007, he presented the current affairs programme Worricker on Sunday, which also included the 5 Live Report. In September 2007 Worricker decided to take a six-month break from both 5 Live and BBC News to go travelling around the world.

He can be heard presenting Weekend on the BBC World Service most Saturday and Sunday mornings.

References

External links
 

1963 births
Living people
BBC Radio 5 Live presenters
BBC World Service presenters
Alumni of the University of Leicester
People from Woking
People educated at Epsom College